Heterosais is a genus of clearwing (ithomiine) butterflies, named by Frederick DuCane Godman and Osbert Salvin in 1880. They are in the brush-footed butterfly family, Nymphalidae.

Species
Arranged alphabetically:
Heterosais edessa (Hewitson, 1855)
Heterosais giulia (Hewitson, 1855)

References 

Ithomiini
Nymphalidae of South America
Nymphalidae genera
Taxa named by Frederick DuCane Godman
Taxa named by Osbert Salvin